Taipei County FC is an association football club from Taiwan. They play at the highest football division in Taiwan, which is semi-professional. Their home stadium is 20,000 capacity Taipei Municipal Stadium.

External links
 Taipei County logo

Football clubs in Taiwan